The men's 200m Butterfly event at the 2006 Central American and Caribbean Games occurred on Wednesday, July 19, 2006 at the S.U. Pedro de Heredia Aquatic Complex in Cartagena, Colombia.

Records at the time of the event were:
World Record: 1:53.93, Michael Phelps (USA), Barcelona, Spain, July 22, 2003.
Games Record: 1:58.45, Juan Veloz (Mexico), 2002 Games in San Salvador (Nov.28.2002).

Results

Final

Preliminaries

References

Men's 200 fly–Prelims results from the official website of the 2006 CACs; retrieved 2009-07-01.
Men's 200 fly–Final results from the official website of the 2006 CACs; retrieved 2009-07-01.

Butterfly, Men's 200m